Jonathan Tyler Daniels (born February 2, 2000) is an American football quarterback for the Rice Owls. He previously played for the West Virginia Mountaineers before entering the transfer portal in 2022. Daniels previously played for USC and Georgia, winning the CFP National Championship with the latter as a backup to Stetson Bennett, before transferring to West Virginia in 2022.

Early years
Daniels was born in Irvine, California, the son of Ali and Steve Daniels. His father is Catholic and his mother is Jewish. He attended Mater Dei High School in Santa Ana, California. During his high school career, he passed for 12,014 yards with 152 touchdowns and 14 interceptions.

Daniels was notable for earning the starting position his freshman year and full play calling responsibility his sophomore year, the latter of which being a distinction that took fellow Mater Dei and USC alum Matt Barkley until his senior year to earn. He threw for 4,849 yards and 67 touchdowns his sophomore season. As a junior, he won the Gatorade Football Player of the Year and then later the Male Athlete of the Year award  after passing for 4,123 yards and scoring 61 total touchdowns (52 passing, nine rushing), leading his team to a 15–0 record and a consensus high school football national championship. Mater Dei held the #1 position from the first week of the season and did not trail at any point in the season, winning every game by at least 10 points in CIF's Division I.

College career

USC

2018 season

Daniels was a five-star recruit and ranked as the number one overall recruit in his class by Rivals.com prior to his reclassification. He committed to the University of Southern California (USC) to play college football. In December 2017, Daniels announced that he would graduate early from high school and reclassify to the 2018 class. He enrolled in USC in June 2018 upon completion of his high school course work. In August 2018, he began USC's two week fall camp in a three-way competition for the starting quarterback position. Within three weeks, Daniels was named the starter over incumbents Matt Fink and Jack Sears, making him the second true freshman in school history to start a season opener. In his true freshman year, Daniels passed for 2,672 yards, 14 touchdowns, and ten interceptions in 11 games, missing just one game due to concussion. The Trojans went 5–7 for the season.

2019 season

In 2019, he won the starting job over Fink, Sears, and Kedon Slovis. During the season opener against Fresno State, he tore his ACL during a sack in the second quarter; at the time of the injury, he had completed 25 of 34 passes for 215 yards, a touchdown, and an interception. Daniels was eventually ruled out for the remainder of the year and Slovis was named the starting quarterback.

Following the emergence of Kedon Slovis, USC head coach Clay Helton announced that Daniels entered his name in the NCAA transfer portal on April 16, 2020.

Georgia

2020 season

On May 28, 2020, Daniels announced that he would be transferring to the University of Georgia. Daniels was granted immediate eligibility to play by the NCAA on July 13, 2020. Going into the 2020 season, Daniels competed with Jamie Newman, D'Wan Mathis, Stetson Bennett, and Carson Beck for the starting job. On September 2, 2020, Newman announced he would opt-out of the 2020 season due to COVID-19 concerns and begin to prepare for the 2021 NFL Draft, leaving Daniels to compete with Mathis, Bennett and Beck. Ultimately, D'Wan Mathis was named the starting quarterback for the season-opener against Arkansas. Daniels was named the backup quarterback behind Stetson Bennett, who replaced Mathis due to poor play against Arkansas. Daniels was named the starting quarterback in the game against Mississippi State after Bennett sustained a shoulder injury against Florida.

On November 21, 2020, Daniels made his first start and appearance with Georgia against Mississippi State and went 28-of-38 for 401 passing yards with 4 touchdowns in the 31–24 win. Following that game, Daniels was named the starter for the remainder of the season. Daniels led the Bulldogs to the Peach Bowl, where he went 26-of-38 for 392 passing yards with one touchdown and one interception in the 24–21 win. The Bulldogs went 4–0 in Daniels' four starts and Daniels finished the season with 80 passing completions out of 119 attempts for 1,231 passing yards with 10 touchdowns and 2 interceptions.

2021 season
Beginning the 2021 season, JT Daniels was the clear frontrunner for starting quarterback, with Stetson Bennett as backup. In the season opener against Clemson, Daniels threw 22-for-30 with 135 yards, with no touchdowns and one interception. Following Georgia's victory, Daniels was sidelined with an oblique injury, leaving Bennett as the starter for an indefinite period. Daniels returned two weeks later against South Carolina and threw 23-for-31 with 303 yards, and two touchdowns and one interception. Daniels started a week later on September 25 against Vanderbilt and threw 9-for-10 with two touchdowns for 129 yards, but was replaced by Bennett. Daniels did not return until November 6 against Missouri; however, he only appeared briefly in relief of a struggling Bennett, throwing 7-of-11 for 82 yards with a touchdown and an interception. Daniels' last appearance came against Charleston Southern on November 20 during senior day (the last home game of the season), and threw 7-for-12, gaining 73 yards and a touchdown during his brief stint. 

Despite a poor performance by Bennett in the SEC championship game against Alabama with two interceptions, coach Kirby Smart remained confident in Bennett's abilities for the remainder of the season. Following Georgia's national championship and Bennett's affirmation to play out his final season of eligibility in 2022, Daniels entered the NCAA transfer portal.

West Virginia

2022 season

On April 13, 2022, Daniels announced his intention to transfer to West Virginia University. He was benched midseason in favour of Garrett Greene. On December 5, 2022, Daniels entered the transfer portal.

Rice

On December 20, 2022, Daniels announced his intention to transfer to Rice University, his fourth program in his six year collegiate career.

Statistics

References

External links
 West Virginia Mountaineers bio
 Rice Owls bio

2000 births
Living people
American football quarterbacks
USC Trojans football players
Georgia Bulldogs football players
Jewish American sportspeople
West Virginia Mountaineers football players
Sportspeople from Santa Ana, California
Players of American football from California
Rice Owls football players